Nemacerota bacsovi is a moth in the family Drepanidae. It was described by Gyula M. László, Gábor Ronkay, László Aladár Ronkay and Thomas Joseph Witt in 2007.

References

Moths described in 2007
Thyatirinae